Coon Rapids is the name of two places in the United States:

 Coon Rapids, Iowa
 Coon Rapids, Minnesota